Christoffer Dybvad (1578–1622) was a Danish mathematician. He was born in Copenhagen, the son of Professor Jørgen Dybvad.

He adapted Simon Stevin's De Thiende into Danish.

References

People from Copenhagen
Danish mathematicians
1578 births
1622 deaths